Dominican Republic-Trinidad and Tobago relations refers to the bilateral relations between the Dominican Republic and the Republic of Trinidad and Tobago. Dominican Republic operates a Embassy in Port of Spain and Trinidad and Tobago operates a Consulate in Santo Domingo. Both countries are members of CARICOM.

History
In 2021, Minister of Trade and Industry Paula Gopee-Scoon discussed developing stronger trade and economic relations with DR ambassador Wellington Darío Bencosme Casataños. Gopee-Scoon indicated that T&T was seeking to increase its non-energy exports to the DR.

Trade
T&T became a net exporter to the Dominican Republic in 2016.  In 2020, Trinidad and Tobago exported US$302 million worth of products to the DR. In the same year, the Dominican Republic exported US$254 million to Trinidad and Tobago. The most common products exported to the Dominican Republic were glass bottles, food stuff and urea. The top imports from the DR were fruits, tobacco and plastic packaging.

See also 

 Foreign relations of the Dominican Republic
 Foreign relations of Trinidad and Tobago
 People of the Dominican Republic

Notes and references 

Dominican Republic–Trinidad and Tobago relations
Trinidad and Tobago
Bilateral relations of Trinidad and Tobago